Donald Mitchell Brown, Jr. (born June 3, 1960) is an American author, attorney, and former United States Navy JAG Officer. He has published eleven military-genre novels, the best known of which is Treason (2005) in which radical Islamic clerics infiltrate the United States Navy Chaplain Corps.  He has published four works of military nonfiction, including his national bestseller, The Last Fighter Pilot: The True Story of the Final Combat Mission of World War II (2017).
Brown may be best known for his work as legal counsel to convicted war criminal Army Lieutenant Clint Lorance, and his authorship of the 2019 book Travesty of Justice: The Shocking Prosecution of Lt. Clint Lorance. On November 15, 2019, President Donald Trump pardoned Lorance, and the book is considered to be a major factor in leading to that pardon. Between the release of Travesty of Justice on March 31, 2019, and Lorance's pardon on November 15, 2019, Brown made numerous national television appearances and penned a number of national Op-eds arguing that President Trump should free and exonerate Lieutenant Lorance. On the Wednesday night before Thanksgiving, November 27, 2019, Brown and Lorance appeared on Hannity, the nightly national broadcast on the Fox News Channel to discuss the presidential pardon and release.

Early life and education
Brown was born in Plymouth in Washington County, North Carolina, on June 3, 1960.  He received a Bachelor of Arts degree from the University of North Carolina at Chapel Hill, and a Juris Doctor degree from Campbell University's Norman Adrian Wiggins School of Law.

Legal career
Brown spent five years as a military attorney in the United States Navy Judge Advocate General's Corps.  He earned a nonresident certificate in International Law from the Naval War College, and published a legal position paper in the Navy's Law Review on how to defend against temporary injunctions filed against the military.  He remained on inactive status with the Navy until 1999, when he separated from the service as a lieutenant commander.  Brown also worked as a special assistant to the United States Attorney for the Southern District of California.

He is currently licensed to practice in North and South Carolina, and is the owner of Brown & Associates, PLLC, a law firm located in Charlotte, North Carolina, where he practices law in the areas of civil litigation, military law, criminal defense, family law, and estate planning.

In 2018, Brown joined the legal team as one of four military JAG officers representing Army First Lieutenant Clint Lorance, and in 2019 published the book Travesty of Justice: The Shocking Prosecution of Lt. Clint Lorance. Lorance had been convicted for second-degree murder in 2013 by a military court-martial, when American paratroopers in his platoon on his command fired on three men on a motorcycle in Afghanistan who were speeding towards their position. In Travesty of Justice, Brown laid out the defense contentions, including the claim that Army prosecutors withheld biometrics evidence proving that the motorcycle riders were enemy Taliban bombmakers. In a series of national television appearances and Op-eds for Fox News in the summer of 2019, Brown pressed Lorance's case further, urging President Donald Trump to provide presidential relief for Lorance, and accused the military justice system of corruption for the prosecutions of Lorance, Navy SEAL Eddie Gallagher, and Army Green Beret Matt Golsteyn.

Authorship

Brown is the author of Zondervan's Navy Justice series with the fiction works Treason (2005), Hostage (2005), Defiance (2006), Black Sea Affair (2008), and Malacca Conspiracy (2010), in which terrorists launch attacks against oil tankers in the Malacca Straights.

In his Pacific Rim series, Brown wrote his sixth novel Thunder in the Morning Calm (2011) on the issue of whether American servicemen who were listed as MIAs may still be alive in North Korea since the Korean War.  Brown stated in interviews that he wrote it to bring attention to the issue.  His seventh novel Fire of the Raging Dragon, a geopolitical action-thriller set in the South China Sea, was released through HarperCollins publishers in November 2012.

Brown wrote Call Sign Extortion 17: The Shoot-Down of SEAL Team Six (2015) on the August 2011 downing of a United States Army CH-47 Chinook helicopter in the War in Afghanistan which killed the air crew along with seven Afghan military personnel and 17 members of Navy SEAL Team Six.  Brown retells the wartime action, explains the life stories of the service members killed that day, and examines the official military explanation of the incident contained in the infamous Colt Report, arguing that series of events were gross incompetence or a massive cover-up.

In March 2017, Brown released his nonfiction work The Last Fighter Pilot: The True Story of the Final Combat Mission of World War II. The book features the true story of Captain Jerry Yellin, U.S. Army Air Force, who flew the final combat mission of World War II over Japan on August 15, 1945, from Iwo Jima, and focuses on the last six months of the air war against Japan, flown by American fighter pilots who were stationed on Iwo Jima, who arrived on the island in March 1945, and remained there until the war's end.

The New York Post included The Last Fighter Pilot on its "must read" list for books in July 2017.  In August 2017, Brown and Yellin appeared together to kick off the book's release at the Ronald Reagan Presidential Library and the Richard Nixon Presidential Library and Museum in Yorba Linda, California to discuss the book and Yellin's experiences in the war.  Publishers Weekly announced that the book had been named to it national bestseller's list for hardcover nonfiction for the week ending August 7, 2017. The popular magazine and website Townhall named Last Fighter Pilot as one of "10 World War II Books Every American Should Read."

Published works

Books
Navy Justice Series
Treason (Zondervan Publishing, 2005) 
Hostage (Zondervan Publishing, 2006) 
Defiance (Zondervan Publishing, 2007) 
Black Sea Affair (Zondervan Publishing, 2007) 
Malacca Conspiracy (Zondervan Publishing 2010)  
Destiny (Mountainview Books, LLC, 2014) 

Pacific Rim Series
Thunder in the Morning Calm (Zondervan Publishing, 2011) 
Fire of the Raging Dragon (Zondervan Publishing, 2012) 
Storming the Black Ice (Harper Collins Publishing, 2014) 

Navy JAG Series
Detained (Harper Collins Publishing, 2015) 
Code 13 (Zondervan Publishing, 2016)  

Nonfiction

Call Sign Extortion 17: The Shoot-Down of SEAL Team Six (Rowman & Littlefield Publishing, through Lyons Press - 2015) 
The Last Fighter Pilot: The True Story of the Final Combat Mission of World War II (Salem Media Group, through Regnery Publishing - 2017) 
Travesty of Justice: The Shocking Prosecution of Lt. Clint Lorance (WildBlue Press - 2019) 
Old Breed General: How Marine Corps General William H. Rupertus Broke the Back of the Japanese in World War II from Guadalcanal to Peleliu Hardcover]]  with Amy Rupertus Peacock (Stackpole Books (Rowman & Littlefield) - 2022)

Law review articles
Temporary Injunctions Aimed at the Military: A Rapid Response Plan for Government Lawyers, by Lieutenant Donald M. Brown, Jr. JAGC, USNR, 40 Naval L. Rev. 157 (1992)

Fox News OPEDs
Don Brown: President Trump, please free Army Lt. Clint Lorance, unjustly convicted of murder in Afghanistan, Fox News, May 7, 2019
Don Brown: It's time for Trump to clean out corruption in the military justice system, Fox News, June 14, 2019
Don Brown: Prosecuting American warriors for killing the enemy undermines 'America first', Fox News, July 1, 2019
Don Brown: Not guilty verdict for Navy SEAL Gallagher is welcome news – He shouldn't have been prosecuted, Fox News, July 3, 2019
Don Brown: Eddie Gallagher is cleared, but two other officers face bogus politically driven murder charges, Fox News, July 8, 2019
Don Brown: Policy banning military from carrying guns on US bases should end, Fox News, July 27, 2019
Don Brown: Trump's pardon of Army Lt. Clint Lorance on wrongful war crime conviction serves justice, Fox News, November 16, 2019
Don Brown: Deadly 'green on blue' attacks by Islamic allied nation troops against Americans must end, Fox News, February 15, 2020

See also

List of American novelists
List of thriller writers
List of United States Navy people
List of military writers
List of University of North Carolina at Chapel Hill alumni

References

External links

 
 Don Brown's Law Firm, Brown & Associates, PLLC
 

1960 births
Living people
United States Navy Judge Advocate General's Corps
American thriller writers
American military writers
20th-century American naval officers
21st-century American novelists
University of North Carolina at Chapel Hill alumni
Campbell University alumni
People from Plymouth, North Carolina
Writers from Charlotte, North Carolina
Christian novelists
North Carolina lawyers
American male novelists
21st-century American male writers
Novelists from North Carolina
21st-century American non-fiction writers
American male non-fiction writers